Telnet Erotika is an extended play by electronic artist Vektroid released in November 2010.

Inspiration
The EP is dedicated to Oneohtrix Point Never, Vektroid's inspiration for making the EP, with a remix of her own song "Nobody Here" appearing here (which was itself sampled from Chris de Burgh's 1986 single "The Lady in Red"). Music videos for the tracks "Virgin Pegasus", "Surfin GeoCities" and "Video Update" were uploaded to her YouTube account. Vektroid re-released the EP as Telnet Complete on April 13, 2017, adding 12 new tracks and an edited version of the first track in the original EP. This version is on her Bandcamp page.

Legacy
Due to Vektroid's use of samples taken from the 1980s and 1990s, the EP is considered to be an early example of the vaporwave genre. On the original Bandcamp page for release, Vektroid described the EP as "ms-dos wave," her own take on the chillwave genre.

Track listing

External links
Internet Archive

References

2010 EPs
Vektroid albums
Chillwave albums
Electronic EPs
Vaporwave albums